Charles Cooper Nott Sr. (September 16, 1827 – March 6, 1916) was an Associate Justice and Chief Justice of the Court of Claims.

Education and career

Born on September 16, 1827, in Schenectady, New York, Nott received an Artium Baccalaureus degree in 1848 from Union College and read law in Albany, New York in 1850. He entered private practice in New York City, New York from 1851 to 1861. He was a captain and colonel in the United States Army from 1861 to 1864 during the American Civil War. He resumed private practice in New York City from 1864 to 1865.

Details of his military service

Nott was appointed a captain in the Fremont Hussars, was in the 5th Iowa Cavalry, and the 131st New York Volunteer Infantry and the 176th New York Volunteer Infantry, achieving the rank of colonel. He was subsequently captured at the fall of Brashear City, and held as a prisoner of war in Texas for thirteen months.

Federal judicial service

Nott was nominated by President Abraham Lincoln on February 21, 1865, to a Judge seat on the Court of Claims (later the United States Court of Claims) vacated by Judge James Hughes. He was confirmed by the United States Senate on February 22, 1865, and received his commission the same day. His service terminated on November 23, 1896, due to his elevation to be Chief Justice of the same court.

Nott received a recess appointment from President Grover Cleveland on November 23, 1896, to the Chief Justice seat on the Court of Claims (later the United States Court of Claims) vacated by Chief Justice William Adams Richardson. He was nominated to the same position by President Cleveland on December 8, 1896. He was confirmed by the Senate on December 15, 1896, and received his commission the same day. His service terminated on December 31, 1905, due to his resignation.

Notable case

Nott wrote the unanimous opinion in Mrs. Lockwood's Case, 9 Ct. Cl. 346 (1874), denying Belva Ann Lockwood admission to the bar of the Court of Claims. She appealed to the United States Supreme Court and lost there as well.

Reporter of decisions

Concurrent with his service on the same court, Nott served as reporter of decisions for the Court of Claims from 1867 to 1914. He was the reporter of decisions of forty-eight volumes of the Court of Claims Reports.

Death

Nott died on March 9, 1916, in New York City.

Family

Nott was the son of Professor Joel B. Nott, a chemist and mineralogist. He was a grandson of Eliphalet Nott, a longtime President of Union College. His son, Charles Cooper Nott Jr., was a judge of the Special Sessions Court.

References

Sources
 A treatise on the mechanics' lien laws of the state of New York (W. C. Little & co., 1856) 
 The coming contraband: a reason against the Emancipation Proclamation, not given by Mr. Justice Curtis, to whom it is addressed, by an officer in the field. (G.P. Putnam, 1862)  
 Sketches of the war (C.T. Evans, 1863; A.D.F. Randolph, 1865)  
 Sketches in prison camps (A. D. F. Randolph, 1865)  
 The seven great hymns of the mediaeval church (Anson D. F. Randolph, 1866)   (New York, E. S. Gorham, 1902)  
 The Mystery of Pinckney Draught, New York (The Century Co., 1908)

External links 

 
 
 
 A Sketch of the Life and Public Services of William Adams Richardson (1898)
 Life in a Texas Prison Pen

Military personnel from Schenectady, New York
People of New York (state) in the American Civil War
Judges of the United States Court of Claims
Union College (New York) alumni
1827 births
1916 deaths
United States Article I federal judges appointed by Abraham Lincoln
19th-century American judges